Bakhta is a rural locality (a village) in Turukhansky District, Krasnoyarsk Krai, Russia. It is part of Turukhansky Municipal District. 

The village is located in the right bank of the Yenisei, by its confluence with the Bakhta River. There is a pier for boats reaching the village. Bakhta houses the Museum of Taiga Traditions.

in the movie of 2010 Happy People: A Year in the Taiga by Werner Herzog focuses on the life of the people in the village of Bakhta.

Protected area
The Central Siberia Nature Reserve, a protected area of the East Siberian taiga ecoregion, is located in the limits of Bakhta.

See also
Tunguska Plateau, located east of the village

References

External links
Central Siberia Nature Reserve 

Rural localities in Turukhansky District
Populated places established in 1745
1745 establishments in the Russian Empire